HSD3B2 is a human gene that encodes for 3beta-hydroxysteroid dehydrogenase/delta(5)-delta(4)isomerase type II or hydroxy-delta-5-steroid dehydrogenase, 3 beta- and steroid delta-isomerase 2.   It is expressed principally in steroidogenic tissues and is essential for steroid hormone production.  A notable exception is the placenta, where HSD3B1 is critical for progesterone production by this tissue.

Mutations in the HSD3B2 gene result in the condition congenital adrenal hyperplasia due to 3 beta-hydroxysteroid dehydrogenase deficiency.

References

Further reading